Stara Gora is a settlement in the hills in the Municipality of Mirna in southeastern Slovenia. The area is part of the traditional region of Lower Carniola and is now included in the Southeast Slovenia Statistical Region.

References

External links
Stara Gora on Geopedia

Populated places in the Municipality of Mirna